William Ian Corneil Binnie  (born April 14, 1939) is a former puisne justice of the Supreme Court of Canada, serving from January 8, 1998 to October 27, 2011. Of the justices appointed to the Supreme Court in recent years, he is one of the few appointed directly from private practice. On his retirement from the Court, he was described by The Globe and Mail as "arguably the country's premier judge", by La Presse as "probably the most influential judge in Canada of the last decade" and by the Toronto Star as “one of the strongest hands on the court.”

Personal life and career as lawyer 

Justice Binnie was born in Montreal, Quebec. He graduated from Trinity College School in 1957 and McGill University in 1960, where he was the News Editor of the McGill Daily, a producer and writer of the Red and White Revue, and a member of the Scarlet Key Honor Society. He then went on to study law at Pembroke College, Cambridge (graduating with an LL.B in 1963 and an LL.M in 1988), where he was the first Canadian to be elected President of the Cambridge Union Society, founded in 1815. He graduated with an LL.B from the University of Toronto in 1965. He was called to the Ontario bar in 1967 and practiced private law at Wright & McTaggart and its successor firms until 1982, at which point he was appointed Associate Deputy Minister of Justice for the Government of Canada. In 1986, he returned to practice at McCarthy Tétrault, In 1992 he was elected a Fellow of the American College of Trial Lawyers. Justice Binnie was appointed to the Supreme Court of Canada in 1998, replacing Justice John Sopinka. Like his predecessor, Binnie never sat as a judge before his appointment to the Supreme Court.

Prior to his appointment, he had argued over 30 appeals before the Supreme Court of Canada. In 1978, Ian Binnie was lead counsel for the appellants in the case that established the test for regulatory impartiality and independence in Committee for Justice and Liberty et al v National Energy Board [1978] 1 SCR 369, and counsel for the accused in the notable case of R. v. Wholesale Travel Inc. [1991] 3 SCR 154 (where the Court determined the application of the Charter to regulatory offenses) , and for the Canadian Broadcasting Corporation and National Film Board in Dagenais v CBC [1994] 3 SCR 835 (where the Court established the principle that freedom of the press was a constitutional value equally deserving of protection as the fair trial interests of the applicant accused) as well as appearing for the Attorney General of Canada in such significant constitutional cases as Operation Dismantle v the Queen [1985] SCR 441 (the application of the Charter to decisions of the Cabinet), [[Canada (Auditor General) v Canada (Minister of Energy Mines and Resources]] [1989] 2 SCR 49 (Cabinet confidentiality) and Reference re the Canada Assistance Plan [1991] 2 SCR 525 (whether Parliament is bound by federal-provincial financial agreements.). He was also one of the counsel representing Canada against the United States before the International Court of Justice in the Gulf of Maine Boundary Dispute ( 1984) and before an international tribunal against France in the maritime boundary dispute concerning St Pierre and Miquelon (1991). Binnie represented parties in judicial inquiries, including the federal government in the Sinclair Stevens Inquiry (1986) into Ministerial conflicts of interest and for various private parties in the provincial Patti Starr Inquiry (1989) into allegations of corruption in political fundraising.

In May 2011, Justice Binnie announced his plans to retire as early as August 30, 2011, unless there was a delay in the appointment of his replacement. He continued until Michael Moldaver and Andromache Karakatsanis were appointed in on October 27, 2011, replacing him and Louise Charron, who had left the court on August 30, 2011.

In retirement, Binnie received various mandates including appointment by the Secretary General of the United Nations to Chair the UN Internal Justice Committee (2015-2019). He was appointed Honorary Colonel of 426 Squadron of the Royal Canadian Air Force in 2012. He was awarded honorary doctorates from the Law Society of Upper Canada (2001), McGill University (2001), Western University (2012), and Trinity College at the University of Toronto (2013).

On November 16, 2011, the New Zealand Justice Minister Simon Power announced that Binnie had been selected to review the David Bain case and Bain's request for compensation for wrongful conviction and imprisonment.

In April 2012, Binnie joined Lenczner Slaght Royce Smith Griffin, a Toronto litigation firm, as counsel. He also joined Arbitration Place as Resident Arbitrator, presiding over both Canadian and international arbitrations. He has chaired numerous investor state dispute arbitrations for the World Bank and the Permanent Court of Arbitration in The Hague.

David Bain compensation claim

David Bain, a New Zealander, had spent 13 years in prison as a result of a conviction, found to be wrongful, of murdering his father, mother and three siblings in the family home in Dunedin. The case made sensational headlines in New Zealand and divided public opinion. Bain was defended by Michael Guest, an inexperienced Dunedin civil practitioner, later disbarred. David Bain claimed that he was out on his paper route when the killings occurred. The only alternative explanation was a murder suicide by the father who resided in a caravan adjacent to the murder scene. After years of fruitless appeals in New Zealand the case made its way to the Judicial Committee of the Privy Council in London, then New Zealand's highest court, which reversed the Court of Appeal of New Zealand because of what the senior British judges called a "substantial miscarriage of justice." At the re-trial, following 12 weeks of testimony, much of it fresh evidence, the jury in Christchurch took only half an hour to acquit David Bain of all charges.

After a 9-month investigation, Binnie concluded that the original police investigation was incompetent, and that Bain was factually innocent on the ‘balance of probabilities’ and recommended he should be paid compensation. The findings of police ineptitude included burning down the family house where the murders occurred before any defence expert had been given the opportunity to conduct an independent investigation of the crime scene, and subsequently destroying the blood and tissue samples and other trial exhibits before the period for appeals expired. In the meantime the NZ Minister for Police, Judith Collins had been appointed Minister of Justice, and rejected the findings of Binnie's report, saying she thought it lacked robust reasoning and showed a misunderstanding of New Zealand law. This led to a public spat between the minister and Justice Binnie, who accused the new Minister of politicizing the process. Without letting Bain's legal team know what was in Binnie's report, Collins said the government would be getting a second opinion on compensation, a decision Bain supporters slammed as opinion shopping. Binnie criticized Collins for consulting with the police and prosecutors while refusing to give a copy of his report to Bain's legal team and for leaking selective details of his report to the media.

Colleagues in Canada rallied to his defence. The President of the Canadian Bar Association, Robert Brun, QC, said Binnie “is held in the highest esteem by both the legal community and the judiciary for his integrity, skill, and experience. He is praised for his honesty and intellect, and his reputation extends well beyond Canada's borders.”

Minister Collins hired a former New Zealand trial judge, Robert Fisher, to criticize Binnie's report, which he did, stating that while the report was well organized and comprehensive, nevertheless in his view Binnie went beyond his mandate and authority, and had made errors in the legal tests applicable to the evidence. Fisher acknowledged that he had not read the evidence and recommended that a further report be undertaken.

Former Australian High Court Justice Ian Callinan was then commissioned by the New Zealand Government to conduct a fresh enquiry. Callinan was not given either the Binnie Report or the Fisher Commentary but proceeded independently. He stated that the only issue before him was whether Bain had met the onus of establishing his factual innocence and concluded that he had not. Bain's lawyers threatened to have Callinan's report set aside on judicial review on the basis that Callinan had rejected Bain's version of events without, as Binnie had done, interviewing Bain personally. In the end, the New Zealand government made a payment to David Bain of $925,000 and the case was declared closed.

The Senate Expenses Inquiry 

In 2015, former Justice Binnie was appointed by the Senate of Canada to investigate sensational claims by the Auditor General of Canada that more than a dozen Senators had misused Senate resources over a period of years. After hearings that extended over several months Binnie reported that while in some cases the Auditor General's criticisms were justified, in other cases the Auditor General's staff had misinterpreted the governing Senate rules and protocols and in particular had taken too narrow a view of what constituted proper Parliamentary business. The Binnie Report was accepted by the Senate and monies were reimbursed by errant Senators as appropriate.

Judgments 

Due to Binnie's background in business and corporate law, he has typically written many of the judgments in those areas of law. However, he also wrote some leading judgments in appeals involving aboriginal rights, constitutional and administrative law and criminal law.

In his first term on the Court, Binnie participated in the Quebec Secession Reference (1998). In his 2019 autobiography, former Supreme Court judge Michel Bastarache revealed that the drafters of the "By the Court" judgement in the Quebec Secession Reference 1998 consisted of Gonthier, Binnie and Bastarache. [Michel Bastarache, Ce Que Je Voudrais Dire a Mes Enflants, Les Presses de l'Universite d'Ottawa 2019 at p 206]. In R v Campbell [1999] 1 SCR 565 Binnie wrote for the Court that in prosecutorial decisions the police are independent of political direction or control. In Whiten v Pilot Insurance [2002] 1 SCR 595, 2002 SCC 18, Binnie wrote for the court developed the principles governing an award of punitive damages in upholding a jury award of a $1 million punitive damages against an insurance company for bad faith rejection of a householder's fire insurance claim.  Canada (House of Commons) v Vaid [2005] 1 SCR 667, 2005 SCC 30 addressed the limits of Parliamentary privilege. During his almost 14 years on the Court Binnie wrote a number of leading decisions on aboriginal rights including R. v. Marshall [1999] 3 SCR 456 which vindicated the treaty right of the Micmac people to gain a reasonable livelihood by fishing, Mikisew Cree First Nation v Canada ( Minister of Canadian Heritage) [2005] 2 SCR 388, 2005 SCC 69, upholding constitutional protection for treaty rights and Lax Kw'alaams Indian Band v Canada (Attorney General) [2011] 3 SCR 535, 2011 SCC 56. which rejected a claimed aboriginal right to the commercial fishery in northwest British Columbia. Other judgments concerned freedom of religion [Syndicat Northcrest v Anselem [2004] 2 SCR 551, 2004 SCC 47, ] intellectual property [Free World Trust v Electro-Sante Inc [2000] 2 SCR 1024, 2000 SCC 66; Veuve Clicquot Ponsardin v Boutiques Cliquot Ltee [2006] 1 SCR 824, 2006 SCC 23) arbitration law (Seidel v TELUS Communications Inc [2011] 1 SCR 531, 2011 SCC 15,) language rights (R v Caron [2011] 1 SCR 78, 2011 SCC 5) the environment ( British Columbia v Canadian Forest Products Ltd [2004] 2 SCR 74, 2004 SCC 38) and journalistic privilege (R v National Post [ 2010] 1 SCR 477; 2010 SCC 16 ).

In criminal law, Justice Binnie wrote leading judgments on similar fact evidence (R v Handy [2002] 2 SCR 908, 2002 SCC 56) unreasonable search and seizure (R. v. Tessling [2004] 3 SCR 432, 2004 SCC 67; R v Kang Brown [2008] 1 SCR 456; 2008 SCC 18) and curbing excessive police powers (R v Clayton [2007 2 SCR 725, 2007 SCC 32). Over the years Justice Binnie dissented on a number of important due process issues, including R. v. Sinclair, 2010 SCC 35 in favour of an accused on the basis that the majority judgment too narrowly restricted the right of the accused to counsel under Section 10(b) of the Charter; R. v. Suberu [2009] 2 SCR 460; 2009 SCC 33 against a majority definition of detention which he thought overstated the average citizen's willingness to ignore a police direction, and R. v. Stone (1999) 2 SCR 290 where he dissented from the majority verdict of guilty on the basis that where an accused raises a plausible defense of automatism the onus should be on the prosecution to prove that the acts of the accused were voluntary and that the accused should not bear the affirmative burden of proving automatism on the balance of probabilities.

See also

 Reasons of the Supreme Court of Canada by Justice Binnie

References

External links 

 Supreme Court of Canada biography 
 Lenczner Slaght profile
 Speech by Binnie on Advocacy

Anglophone Quebec people
Justices of the Supreme Court of Canada
Lawyers in Ontario
Presidents of the Cambridge Union
McGill University alumni
1939 births
Living people
People from Montreal
University of Toronto Faculty of Law alumni
Companions of the Order of Canada
Trinity College School alumni